This article shows the previous rosters of Resovia volleyball team at PlusLiga in Poland.

2020/2021
The following is the Asseco Resovia roster in the 2020–21 PlusLiga.

2019/2020
The following is the Asseco Resovia roster in the 2019–20 PlusLiga.

2018/2019
The following is the Asseco Resovia roster in the 2018–19 PlusLiga.

2017/2018
The following is the Asseco Resovia roster in the 2017–18 PlusLiga.

2016/2017
The following is the Asseco Resovia roster in the 2016–17 PlusLiga.

2015/2016
The following is the Asseco Resovia roster in the 2015–16 PlusLiga.

2014/2015
The following is the Asseco Resovia roster in the 2014–15 PlusLiga.

2013/2014
The following is the Asseco Resovia roster in the 2013–14 PlusLiga.

2012/2013
The following is the Asseco Resovia roster in the 2012–13 PlusLiga.

2011/2012
The following is the Asseco Resovia roster in the 2011–12 PlusLiga.

References

PlusLiga squads
Squads